Anthology, also called Anthology - 25 Years and Anthology 1968-1993, is a compilation double album by Krautrock artists Can which was released in 1994. Several of the songs are presented in edited form. The first CD has the same track listing as Can's previous compilation, Cannibalism.

Track listing

N.B. the re-edits on Disc One were originally done for the compilation Cannibalism in 1978. 
(*) The 2007 Remastered Edition uses the album versions for "Dizzy Dizzy", "Aspectacle" and "Below This Level" instead of the edits used on the 1994 compilation.

Personnel
Holger Czukay – bass guitar (1968-1976, 1989), wave receiver & spec. sounds (1977), editing (1979), vocals
Michael Karoli – guitar, electric violin, vocals
Jaki Liebezeit – drums, percussion, vocals
Irmin Schmidt – keyboards, vocals
 Malcolm Mooney – vocals (1968-1970, 1989-1991)
 Damo Suzuki – vocals, percussion (1970-1973)
Rosko Gee – bass, vocals (1977-1979)
Rebop Kwaku Baah – percussion, vocals (1977-1979)

References

External links
 Anthology at the official Can/Spoon Records site. Accessed 30 April 2008.

1994 compilation albums
Can (band) albums